Caradoc or Caradog was a Welsh hermit and harpist.

Life
Caradoc was a Welsh nobleman, native of Brecknockshire, who, after he had received a liberal education, enjoyed the confidence of Rees, prince of South Wales, and held an honourable place in his court. The prince one day, on account of two greyhounds which were lost, fell into such a fury against Caradoc as to threaten his life. Caradoc, from this disgrace learned the inconstancy of worldly honours, and repaired to Landaff, where he received from the bishop the clerical tonsure, and for some time served God in the church of St. Theliau.

Desirous of finding solitude, he afterwards spent some years in a little hut, which he built himself, near the abandoned church of St. Cendydd Church in Gower, later taking up residence on Barry Island at St. Issels. His reputation for sanctity filled the whole country, and the archbishop of Menevia, or St. David's, calling him to that town, promoted him to priestly orders. Caradoc then retired with certain devout companions, to the isle of Ary. Certain pirates from Norway, who often infested these coasts, carried them off prisoners, but, fearing the judgments of God, safely set them on shore again the next day. However, the archbishop of Menevia assigned Caradoc another habitation in the monastery of St. Hismael, commonly called Ysam, in the country of Ross, or Pembrokeshire.

He served a local king in southern Wales before Caradoc was later forced into exile by Henry I's invasion of the region, Caradoc went to Haroldston, where he occupied the cell of St. Ismael.

Legacy
St Caradoc's Church in Lawrenny, Wales probably dates back to the twelfth century.
He also made a name for himself and appears on Rougemont School's house colour.

Notes

Welsh Roman Catholic saints
12th-century Christian saints
1124 deaths
Year of birth unknown